Smith v. Texas, 550 U.S. 297 (2007), was a United States Supreme Court case about a challenge to a Texas death penalty court procedure.  Justice Anthony Kennedy wrote the opinion of the Court, holding 5-4 that the Texas procedure was improper.  Justice Samuel Alito wrote a dissent.

Background 
LaRoyce Lathair Smith was convicted of capital murder in the 1991 murder of a Dallas Taco Bell employee. He was sentenced to death by a jury in Dallas County, Texas. In 2004, the Supreme Court overturned his death sentence because of an improper jury instruction and sent the case back to Texas state court. After the case was remanded, the Texas Court of Criminal Appeals held that Smith’s pre-trial objections did not preserve the claim of constitutional error he asserted. "Under the Texas framework for determining whether an instructional error merits reversal, the state court explained, this procedural default required Smith to show egregious harm — a burden the court held he did not meet." Smith appealed, and the Court granted certiorari. Smith's attorneys for the appeal included four retired federal appeals court judges.  The case was argued before the Supreme Court on January 16, 2007, with UT Austin Professor Jordan Steiker appearing for Smith and Texas Solicitor General Ted Cruz appearing for the state, with Gene Schaerr appearing for the State of California as a friend of Texas.

Decision

Issue
The Court granted certiorari on two issues. 
Was the Texas Court of Criminal Appeals correct in holding that the improper jury instruction was harmless error and not sufficient to invalidate his death sentence?
Was the Texas court correct to require a standard of "egregious harm" when evaluating whether an unconstitutional jury instruction should invalidate a death sentence?

Opinion of the Court
On April 24, 2007, the Supreme Court reversed and remanded.  Justice Kennedy, writing for the 5-4 majority, held that the Texas Court "misunderstood the interplay of [previous death penalty decisions,] and it mistook which of Smith’s claims furnished the basis for this Court’s opinion in Smith I. These errors of federal law led the state court to conclude Smith had not preserved at trial the claim this Court vindicated in Smith I, even when the Court of Criminal Appeals previously had held Smith’s claim ... was preserved. The state court’s error of federal law cannot be the predicate for requiring Smith to show egregious harm."

Having resolved the second issue in Smith's favor, the Court did not address the first issue.

Concurrence
Justice Souter issued a brief concurrence, adding only that "in some later case, we may be required to consider whether harmless error review is ever appropriate in a case with error as described in Penry v. Lynaugh. We do not and need not address that question here."

Dissent
Justice Alito dissented, stating that the issue was one of ordinary state procedure, and that Smith had indeed failed to raise any objection to the jury instruction. "Accordingly," he wrote, "I would dismiss for want of jurisdiction."

Subsequent developments 
In 2008, one year after Smith v. Texas was decided, the subject, LaRoyce Smith, (former death row number #999007) had his sentence commuted to life imprisonment.

Notes

External links
 

United States Supreme Court cases
United States Supreme Court cases of the Roberts Court
United States death penalty case law
Capital punishment in Texas
2007 in Texas
2007 in United States case law
Ted Cruz